The Plague Dogs is a 1982  adult animated adventure drama film, based on the 1977 novel of the same name by Richard Adams. It was written, directed and produced by Martin Rosen, who also directed Watership Down, the film adaptation of another novel by Adams. The Plague Dogs was produced by Nepenthe Productions; it was released by Embassy Pictures in the United States and by United Artists in the United Kingdom. The film was originally released unrated in the United States, but for its DVD release, was later re-rated PG-13 by the MPAA for mature themes such as animal cruelty, violent imagery, and emotionally distressing scenes. The Plague Dogs is the first non-family-oriented MGM animated film, and marks their first adult animated feature by the studio.

The film's story is centered on two dogs named Rowf and Snitter, who escape from a research laboratory in Great Britain. In the process of telling the story, the film highlights the cruelty of performing vivisection and animal research for its own sake (though Rosen said that this was not an anti-vivisection film, but an adventure), an idea that had only recently come to public attention during the 1960s–1970s.

Plot 
Rowf, a labrador-mix, and Snitter, a smooth fox terrier, are two of many dogs used for experimental purposes at an animal research facility in the Lake District of north-western England. Snitter has had his brain experimented upon while Rowf has been drowned and resuscitated repeatedly. One evening, Snitter squeezes under the netting of his cage and into Rowf's, where they discover his cage is unlatched. They explore the facility in order to escape until they sneak into the incinerator, where they are nearly killed before finally escaping.

Initially relieved and eager to experience their new freedom, the dogs are soon faced not only with the realities of life in the wild but with another more terrifying realization—they are being hunted by their former captors. They come to befriend the Tod, a nameless Geordie-accented fox who goes by the local slang term for a wild fox. The Tod teaches them to hunt in the wild in exchange for a share of their kills. Snitter hopes for a new home as he once had a master, but after accidentally killing a man by stepping onto the trigger of his shotgun as he climbs up onto him, Snitter loses hope. As time passes the two dogs grow emaciated, having to steal more and more food while still avoiding capture. The Tod is also proven to be difficult for the dogs to understand and cooperate. When the Tod finds a nest of eggs, he eats them all himself, enraging Rowf. The Tod himself disapproves of their risky behaviour, like killing domestic sheep grazing on the local hills. They go their separate ways for a time, but the Tod eventually returns to assist them by distracting a lab-hired gunman who then falls to his death. The three reconcile and wander about aimlessly, with the 3rd Battalion Parachute Regiment and the media roped into the pursuit, driven by rumours of the two dogs carrying bubonic plague and killing humans and sheep.

The Tod parts company with the two dogs after leading them to a train  on the Ravenglass and Eskdale Railway. While the dogs escape on the train, the Tod sacrifices his life distracting the humans in order to allow Snitter and Rowf to escape. Thanks to the Tod's distraction, Snitter and Rowf arrive at the coastal village of Ravenglass, but upon departing the train, the two dogs are spotted by an RAF Sea King helicopter and are pursued by it until they reach the shoreline and can run no further. As armed troops approach and prepare to shoot the dogs, Snitter looks out over the water and claims to see an island - he jumps into the sea and begins to swim to it. Rowf is hesitant to follow due to his conditioned fear of water, but his greater fear of the gunmen drives him to jump in as well and catch up with Snitter. Two gunshots are fired at the dogs but seemingly miss; immediately a white mist envelops the pair, and the humans and the helicopter disappear. The dogs swim through the mist towards the island Snitter claims to see but Rowf can't spot, until, at last, Snitter begins to doubt that "there is any island" and he stops paddling, losing hope. Rowf, however, claims to finally spot the island and urges Snitter to continue. 

The dogs venture forth heading further into the mist, en route to what maybe is an island possibly waiting for them on the other side. The fates of Rowf and Snitter are left on an ambiguous note, as the sea they are swimming through is engulfed in an even thicker mist. The following moment segues to the reveal of an island visible in the distance on the horizon. It is left uncertain if the body of land shown actually exists and is really there or if it is just an illusion with symbolic meaning.

Cast

Production 

The film was animated in both Britain and San Francisco, California between 1979 and 1982. British animators such as Arthur Humberstone, Alan Simpson, George Jackson, and Colin White came from the unit that had previously worked on Watership Down. The San Francisco crew included Brad Bird, Phil Robinson, and Retta Scott, a "Disney veteran who had animated the vicious hunting dogs in Bambi."

Goldcrest Films invested £900,000 in the film and earned £308,000, losing the company £595,000. Jake Eberts who helped finance this and Watership Down thought the filmmakers made two errors: the film was downbeat with an unhappy ending, unlike the book, and was made without a distributor (an arrangement was made with Embassy but then the filmmakers wanted to re-negotiate and Embassy pulled out while United Artists became the film's UK distributor).

End theme 
The theme song, "Time And Tide", was composed and sung by Alan Price.

The song, as well as dialogue from the film, was sampled by the Canadian industrial group Skinny Puppy for their anti-vivisection single, "Testure", from their 1988 album VIVIsectVI.

Reception 
The film had a test screening in Seattle on 17 December 1983. Rosen had difficulty in finding distributors for the film, and it entered a limited release in the U.S. on 9 January 1985.
Janet Maslin, in her 1985 New York Times review of the U.S. release, praised the visual style: "Martin Rosen treats his Plague Dogs almost as though it were live action. He varies the scenery and the camera angles imaginatively [...] Mr. Rosen's direction is quite ingenious, much more so than Mr. Adams's story."

Home media 
There are two versions of the film: An 86-minute version and a 103-minute version. The only country that offered the full-length film on DVD was Australia until it was released in the UK on 7 January 2008.

While many of the missing scenes in the 86 minute cut were mostly removed to reduce running time, one scene taken from the book was removed because of its shocking content: After the hired gunman Ackland falls to his death from a steep crag from which he was attempting to shoot the dogs, a military helicopter flies over the snow-covered crags and valleys and the soldiers in the helicopter find the body ripped to shreds, implying that the starving dogs had eaten the corpse.

The original VHS release of the full theatrical cut of the film was released by Thorn Productions in 1982. Only around 8,000 copies of this version were made. A sell through edition of the tape was later released in the UK by Warner Home Video. The 86 minute cut was released on VHS by Charter Entertainment.

In 2002, Anchor Bay released a Region 2 DVD version of the film, but it contained the US recut. Soon afterwards, the Dutch budget label, Indies Home Entertainment, released a Region 2 disc which also contained the US cut but includes forced Dutch subtitles. In 2004, a DVD version of the film was released by Hollywood DVD in the UK with the US cut. Trinity Home Entertainment released their DVD in the United States the same year; Trinity tried to get the full cut, but when they were unable to obtain it, they ended up settling with using the truncated US version. Trinity's DVD was re-released by Phase 4 Films in 2010.

In 2005, Australian distributor Umbrella Entertainment, released the full theatrical cut of the film as well as the truncated version on Region 4 DVD (they also released the full theatrical cut of Watership Down), sourced from Martin Rosen's private print. This was probably the only full cut of the film in existence aside from the rare Thorn and Warner Home Video VHSes and the original master. The same print was later released on Region 2 DVD in the UK by Optimum Releasing in 2008.

In 2017, Shout! Factory announced that they had acquired the rights to the film in the United States, and that they would release the film for the first time on Blu-ray on 24 February 2018 under their Shout Select line. In late 2017, Shout! Factory announced that they had delayed the film's Blu-ray release to work with director Martin Rosen in hopes of releasing the original 103-minute version of the film instead of the 86-minute version. In September 2018, Shout! Factory announced that the original 103-minute version of the film would be released on Blu-ray on 15 January 2019. The 2019 release includes both a 2K restored version of the original 103-minute version of the film and the 86-minute version of the film, as well as an interview with director Martin Rosen regarding the production of the film. Screenbound Films also released a Blu-ray of the film in the UK on 10 August 2020, likewise containing both the theatrical and extended cuts.

It was also featured on The Criterion Channel as part of their arthouse animation lineup.

References

External links 

 
 
 
 Press kit photographs from The Plague Dogs
 Official trailer

1982 films
1982 animated films
1980s adventure drama films
1982 independent films
British adventure drama films
British independent films
American adventure drama films
1980s American animated films
American independent films
United Artists films
Metro-Goldwyn-Mayer films
Animated drama films
Animated films about trains
Animated films about dogs
Animated films about foxes
Animated films based on novels
Films directed by Martin Rosen
Films based on British novels
Films about animal rights
Films about animal testing
United Artists animated films
Metro-Goldwyn-Mayer animated films
British survival films
1982 drama films
American survival films
1980s English-language films
British adult animated films
1980s British films